A fembot is an android specifically gendered feminine.

Fembot or Fembots may refer to:

Music
 Fembots (band), a Canadian indie rock band
 "Fembot" (song), a song by Robyn 
 "Fembot in a Wet T-Shirt", a song from the album Joe's Garage by Frank Zappa

Other uses
 Fembot Collective, an international collective of feminist media activists, artists, producers, and scholars
 Fembots (Austin Powers), fictional characters in the Austin Powers film series